Meaux station (French: Gare de Meaux) is a railway station serving Meaux, Seine-et-Marne department, northern France. It is on the Paris–Strasbourg railway, and offers connections to Paris-Est, Château-Thierry and La Ferté-Milon.

The rail line connecting Paris to Meaux was established in 1849. The nowadays SNCF train station, still in use, was built in 1890.

Train services 
Train services go: 
Towards Paris Gare de l'Est: 2 to 4 trains per hour 
Towards Château-Thierry 1 or 2 trains per hour 
Towards La Ferté-Milon 1 or 2 trains per hour

Bus services 

Alongside the Meaux train station there is also the main bus station in the city, with more than 30 bus lines serving the whole eastern metropolitan area of the Paris agglomeration.

Future 
In the future, Meaux will be the terminus for RER E, which now is Chelles. This gives Meaux a direct connection towards downtown Paris, via the Magenta and the Haussmann – Saint-Lazare stations. Services are projected to begin in 2018.

References

External links

 

Railway stations in Seine-et-Marne
Railway stations in France opened in 1849
Buildings and structures completed in 1890